Below are lists of films produced in Egypt in the 1960s.

List of Egyptian films of 1960
List of Egyptian films of 1961
List of Egyptian films of 1962
List of Egyptian films of 1963
List of Egyptian films of 1964
List of Egyptian films of 1965
List of Egyptian films of 1966
List of Egyptian films of 1967
List of Egyptian films of 1968
List of Egyptian films of 1969

External links
 Egyptian films at the Internet Movie Database

1960s
Egypt